A clothing bin is a container in which clothing is placed to be donated to charity organizations (e.g., the Salvation Army or The Smith Family) or for recycling in other ways. They are typically provided by the charities themselves or by local authorities.

Bins are often vandalised or filled with unsuitable materials (including rubbish). These are costly for the organizations concerned to dispose of, and this misuse has at times lead to bins being withdrawn. On-the-spot fines are often threatened through signs on the bins.

See also
 Hamper

Sources
 Recycling Fact Sheet at zerowaste.sa.gov.au

External links 
 
 

Clothing containers
Donation